Interchangeability can refer to:
Interchangeable parts, the ability to select components for assembly at random and fit them together within proper tolerances
Interchangeability (computer science), the ability that an object can be replaced by another object without affecting code using the object
Interchangeable random variables in mathematics